KCEI-LD, virtual and UHF digital channel 18, is a low-powered independent television station licensed to Taos, New Mexico, United States. It airs local programming about the history of Taos from the Taos local television organization.

References

CEI-LD
Low-power television stations in the United States
Television channels and stations established in 2014
2014 establishments in New Mexico